Washington Highlands or variant may refer to:

 Washington Highlands, Washington, D.C.
 Geography of Washington (state), for the highlands of Washington state, USA
 Geography of Washington, D.C., for the highlands of the District of Columbia, USA
 Highland, Washington, CDP in Washington state
 Washington Township, Highland County, Ohio
 Highland Park, Seattle, Washington